GBR-12935 is a piperazine derivative which is a potent and selective dopamine reuptake inhibitor. It was originally developed in its 3H radiolabelled form for the purpose of mapping the distribution of dopaminergic neurons in the brain by selective labelling of dopamine transporter proteins. This has led to potential clinical uses in the diagnosis of Parkinson's disease, although selective radioligands such as Ioflupane (¹²³I) are now available for this application. GBR-12935 is now widely used in animal research into Parkinson's disease and the dopamine pathways in the brain.

See also 
 Vanoxerine
 GBR-12783
 GBR-13069
 GBR-13098
 DBL-583

References 

Dopamine reuptake inhibitors
1-(2-(Diphenylmethoxy)ethyl)piperazines
VMAT inhibitors